Kentucky Route 309 (KY 309) is a  state highway in Fulton County, Kentucky, that runs from Mt. Olive Road in rural Obion County, Tennessee, northwest of Woodland Mills immediately south of the Kentucky–Tennessee state line to KY 94 and Broadway Street in Hickman. KY 309 is unlike most state routes, as its first  of mileage is located in Tennessee, making it one of just a few select Kentucky state routes that have mileage in another state.

Major intersections

References

0309
Kentucky Route 309